Braceville is a village in Will County, Illinois, United States, with a portion in Grundy County. The population was 793 at the 2010 census.

History
Braceville was founded under the name "Sulphur Springs" by Reverend L. S. Robbins in 1834. In 1848, after Robbin's death, the town elected its first official supervisor, B. R. Dowd, who changed the name to Braceville after his home town of Braceville, Ohio. When coal was discovered in the region, residents became interested in the mining industry. However, no mines have ever been opened, and gradually, the town shifted its focus on other industries. The population has fluctuated over time, but is now growing at a steady rate.

Geography
Braceville is located at  (41.226340, -88.265141).

Demographics

As of the census of 2000, there were 792 people, 284 households, and 220 families residing in the village. The racial makeup of the village was 98.86% White, 0.13% Native American, 0.13% from other races, and 0.88% from two or more races. Hispanic or Latino of any race were 1.14% of the population.

There were 284 households, out of which 39.1% had children under the age of 18 living with them, 60.9% were married couples living together, 10.6% had a female householder with no husband present, and 22.5% were non-families. 18.0% of all households were made up of individuals, and 4.9% had someone living alone who was 65 years of age or older.  The average household size was 2.79 and the average family size was 3.13.

In the village, the population was spread out, with 29.9% under the age of 18, 10.2% from 18 to 24, 31.9% from 25 to 44, 21.0% from 45 to 64, and 6.9% who were 65 years of age or older.  The median age was 31 years. For every 100 females, there were 97.5 males.  For every 100 females age 18 and over, there were 104.8 males.

The median income for a household in the village was $47,059, and the median income for a family was $50,395. Males had a median income of $40,208 versus $24,722 for females. The per capita income for the village was $17,586.  About 3.1% of families and 4.3% of the population were below the poverty line, including 1.8% of those under age 18 and 2.8% of those age 65 or over.

Illinois Route 129 Bridge
For many years, Route 66 (and later Route 129) crossed a railroad line and a creek via a bowstring arch bridge south of Braceville. Route 53 on the south side of the railroad line did not cross anything, so there was only one bridge on the northern highway. The two state highways traveled parallel to each other for several miles. In 1994 however, the arch bridge was closed off, and was removed in 2000.

Notable people

 Al Braithwood, pitcher for the Pittsburgh Rebels

References

Villages in Grundy County, Illinois
Villages in Illinois